Soong-Chan Rah is Milton B. Engebretson Professor of Church Growth and Evangelism at North Park University, Chicago.

Biography
Rah obtained his B.A. in political science and history/sociology from Columbia University. He finished his M.Div. from Gordon Conwell Theological Seminary (GCTS) and his Th.M. from Harvard University. He also completed a D.Min. at GCTS and a Th.D. at Duke Divinity School.

He was the founding senior pastor of Cambridge Community Fellowship Church, a multi-ethnic, urban church in Cambridge, Massachusetts. He has previously worked with InterVarsity Christian Fellowship in the Boston area.

He is currently Milton B. Engebretson Professor of Church Growth and Evangelism at North Park University and will start his role as Robert Munger Professor of Evangelism at Fuller Theological Seminary in summer 2021.

He serves on the boards of Sojourners, the Christian Community Development Association, World Vision, and the Catalyst Leadership Center. His book, Prophetic Lament: A Call for Justice in Troubled Times, received affirmation as The Englewood Review of Books Best Books of 2015 and Relevant's Top 10 Books of 2015.

Personal life
He is married to Sue, a special educator. They have two children, Annah and Elijah.

Selected works
 Prophetic Lament: A Call for Justice in Troubled Times. Downers Grove, IVP. 2015. 
 Many Colours: Cultural Intelligence for a Changing Church. Chicago: Moody Publishers, 2010. 
 The Next Evangelicalism: Freeing the Church from Western Cultural Captivity. Downers Grove, IVP. 2009.

References

Living people
Columbia University alumni
Gordon–Conwell Theological Seminary alumni
Harvard Divinity School alumni
Duke Divinity School alumni
Year of birth missing (living people)